The Rush Alzheimer's Disease Center (RADC) is a research center located in Rush University Medical Center. The Rush Alzheimer's Disease Center is one of 29 Alzheimer's centers in the U.S. designated and funded by the National Institute on Aging.

The RADC is a leader in research into the causes and treatment of Alzheimer's disease.
One of its earliest research projects was the Religious Orders Study. An important influence on the development of the Religious Orders Study was the Nun Study founded by Dr. David Snowdon.  The Religious Orders Study was initially funded by the National Institute on Aging in 1993.  It is a study utilizing volunteers in the religious community, including priests, nuns, and brothers, who agree to donate their brains to the RADC after they die, providing doctors with an opportunity to look for postmortem correlations between lifestyle and Alzheimer’s disease. Scientists at the RADC use the brains to study a broad range of factors relating to Alzheimer's disease and other common diseases of age, and share tissue samples from those brains, as well as data, with other medical institutions around the country.

The RADC's Memory and Aging Project (MAP) followed in 1997 and uses volunteers from the community. The study design is similar to the Religious Orders Study and enrolls volunteers without dementia who agree to annual clinical evaluation and organ donation.

Both studies are ongoing, and have created research opportunities at Rush University, including the Mediterranean-DASH Intervention for Neurodegenerative Delay MIND diet research, Minority Aging Research Study (MARS), which is a study of decline in cognitive function and risk of Alzheimer's disease in older African Americans, with brain donation after death added as an optional component, the Latino CORE study, relating to older Latino adults, and a study newly-funded by NIA to study Alzheimer's disease in Brazil.

The RADC also sponsors an array of community outreach and education programs.

References 

Alzheimer's disease research
Alzheimer's and dementia organizations
National Institutes of Health
Rush Medical College
Rush University
Medical research institutes in the United States
Research institutes in Illinois